Coots Lake is a reservoir in Polk County, in the U.S. state of Georgia.

Coots Lake was created in 1960, and named for the lake's architect, Coolidge "Coot" Hulsey, Sr.

See also
List of lakes in Georgia (U.S. state)

References

Geography of Polk County, Georgia
Reservoirs in Georgia (U.S. state)